The 1962 International 100 was a motor race staged at the Warwick Farm Raceway in New South Wales, Australia on 4 February 1962.
Contested as a Formula Libre race, it was staged over a distance of 101.25 miles (163 km) and was the second International 100 race to be held at Warwick Farm. 

The race was won by Stirling Moss, driving a Cooper T53 Coventry Climax.

Race results

Notes

 Pole Position: Stirling Moss, 1:37.5 
 Race distance: 45 laps (101.25 miles, 163 km) 
 Entries: 17 
 Starters: 11 
 Finishers: 7 
 Fastest lap: Bruce McLaren, 1:37.5

References

International 100
Motorsport at Warwick Farm